LG Electronics Inc. is a South Korean multinational electronics company headquartered in Yeouido-dong, Seoul, South Korea. LG Electronics is a part of LG Corporation, the fourth largest chaebol  in South Korea, and often considered as the pinnacle of LG Corp with the group's chemical and battery division LG Chem. It comprises four business units: home entertainment, mobile communications, home appliances & air solutions, and vehicle components. LG Electronics acquired Zenith in 1995 and the largest shareholder of LG Display, world's largest display company by revenue in 2020. LG Electronics is also the world's second largest TV manufacturer behind Samsung Electronics. The company has 128 operations worldwide, employing 83,000 people.

History

1958–1960s
In 1958, LG Electronics was founded as GoldStar. It was established in the aftermath of the Korean War to provide the rebuilding nation with domestically produced consumer electronics and home appliances. The start of the country's national broadcasting that created a booming electronics market and a close relationship it quickly forged with Hitachi helped GoldStar to produce South Korea's first radios, TVs, refrigerators, washing machines and air conditioners. GoldStar was one of the LG groups with a brethren company, Lak-Hui (pronounced "Lucky") Chemical Industrial Corp. which is now LG Chem and LG Households. GoldStar merged with Lucky Chemical and LS Cable on 28 February 1995, changing the corporate name to Lucky-Goldstar and then finally to LG Electronics.to be continued

1970s–1990s

Goldstar first went public in 1970; by 1976, it was producing 1 million televisions annually. In 1982, Goldstar opened its first overseas factory, which was based in Huntsville, Alabama.

In 1994, GoldStar officially adopted the LG Electronics brand and a new corporate logo. In 1995, LG Electronics acquired the US-based TV manufacturer Zenith and absorbed it four years later. Also in that year, LG Electronics made the world's first CDMA digital mobile handsets and supplied Ameritech and GTE in the US, the LGC-330W digital cellular phone. The company was also awarded UL certification in the US. In 1998, LG developed the world's first 60-inch plasma TV and established a joint venture in 1999 with Philips  LG.Philips LCD  which now goes by the name LG Display. In 1999, LG Semiconductor merged with Hynix.

2000s–present
In order to create a holding company, the former LG Electronics was split off in 2002, with the "new" LG Electronics being spun off and the "old" LG Electronics changing its name to LG EI. It was then merged with and into LG CI in 2003 (the legal successor of the former LG Chem), so the company that started as GoldStar does not currently exist.

LG Electronics plays a large role in the global consumer electronics industry; it was the second-largest LCD TV manufacturer worldwide as of 2013. By 2005, LG was a Top 100 global brand and recorded a brand growth of 14% in 2006. As of 2009, its display manufacturing affiliate, LG Display, was the world's largest LCD panel manufacturer. In 2010, LG Electronics entered the smartphone industry. LG Electronics has since continued to develop various electronic products, such as releasing the world's first 84-inch ultra-HD TV for retail sale.

On 5 December 2012, the antitrust regulators of the European Union fined LG Electronics and five other major companies (Samsung, Thomson since 2010 known as Technicolor, Matsushita which today is Panasonic Corp, Philips and Toshiba) for fixing prices of TV cathode-ray tubes in two cartels lasting nearly a decade.

On 11 June 2015, LG Electronics found itself in the midst of a human rights controversy when The Guardian published an article by Rosa Moreno, a former employee of an LG television assembly factory.

At the end of 2016, LG Electronics merged its German branch (situated in Ratingen) and European headquarter (situated in London) together in Eschborn, a suburb of Frankfurt am Main.

In March 2017, LG Electronics was sued for its handling of hardware failures with recent smartphones such as the LG G4.

Koo Bon-joon, who was the CEO and the current vice chairman of LG Electronics, was replaced by his nephew Koo Kwang-mo in July 2018 as CEO and vice chairman. The move came after the succession of Koo Kwang-mo as the chairman of the parent company LG Corporation who succeeded his adoptive father and uncle Koo Bon-moo after Bon-moo died of a brain tumor on 20 May 2018.

LG announced in November 2018 that Hwang Jeong-hwan, who took the job as president of LG Mobile Communications in October 2017, will be replaced by Brian Kwon, who is head of LG's hugely profitable home entertainment business, from 1 December 2018. Also in 2018, LG decided to stop smartphone production in South Korea to move production to Vietnam, in order to stay competitive. LG said Vietnam provides an "abundant labor force" and that 750 workers at its South Korean handset factory would be relocated to its home appliance plant.

On 5 April 2021, LG announced its withdrawal from the phone manufacturing industry after continuous loss in the market. In 2020, LG faced a loss of 5 trillion won (US$4.4 billion).

In June 2021, the YouTube channel Hardware Unboxed published a video alleging an attempt by a representative of LG to manipulate the review of one of LG's gaming monitors. The representative, in an email shown in the video, attempts to influence the editorial outcome of the review by indicating testing methods and aspects of the display to be followed by the channel. This came a few months after a similar incident between the creators and Nvidia in which Nvidia warned them that if they continue emphasizing on rasterization rather than ray tracing in Nvidia's graphics cards, they would no longer receive review samples.

As of 1 December 2021, the current Chief Strategy Officer William Cho will take over for Bong-seok Kwon as the CEO of LG Electronics.

In June 2022, LG acquired AppleMango, a South Korean EV charger manufacturer with a 60% purchase of the company's stocks

In June 2022, the American publication Consumer Reports rated LG home appliances as the most reliable in the U.S. consumer market.

COVID-19 response
On 25 December 2021, LG Electronics launched a video campaign showing some of the initiatives the company has taken during the COVID-19 pandemic to support India. The video shows how the company has handled the pandemic from the beginning and includes urgings of good hygiene practices to include social distancing, hand-washing, mask wearing, and using hand sanitizers.

In a strategy to cope with demand for contactless shopping during the COVID-19 pandemic, LG Electronics has opened a number of unmanned stores that allow for customers to authenticate themselves at the main entrance, check product information, and purchase products using a mobile phone or QR code. The company currently operates nine unmanned stores and this will increase to 30 by the end of June 2022. Currently these retail locations are only available in South Korea.

United States headquarters

The company proposed to build an environmentally friendly facility in Englewood Cliffs, incidental to Bergen County's per-capita leading Korean American population, having received an initially favorable legal decision concerning building height issues. The plan, while approved by the local government, met with resistance from the segments of the general public as well as government officials in New Jersey and adjacent New York. The initial court decision upholding the local government approval was overturned by a New Jersey appellate court in 2015 and LG subsequently submitted a revised, scaled-down, 64-foot building for approval by the borough of Englewood Cliffs in 2016. LG broke ground on the new US$300 million Englewood Cliffs headquarters on 7 February 2017, to be completed in late 2019.

Products
LG Electronics' products include televisions, home theater systems, refrigerators, washing machines, computer monitors, wearable devices, solar modules, smart appliances and, formerly, smartphones.

Televisions

The LG SL9000 was one of several new Borderless HDTV's advertised for release at IFA Berlin in 2009. LG Electronics launched an OLED TV in 2013 and 65-inch and 77-inch sizes in 2014. LG Electronics introduced its first Internet TV in 2007, originally branded as "NetCast Entertainment Access" devices. They later renamed the 2011 Internet televisions to "LG Smart TV" when more interactive television features were added, that enable the audience to receive information from the Internet while watching conventional TV programming.

In November 2013, a blogger discovered that some of LG's smart TVs silently collect filenames from attached USB storage devices and program viewing data, and transmit the information to LG's servers and LG-affiliated servers. Shortly after this blog entry went live, LG disabled playback on its site of the video, explaining how its viewer analytics work, and closed the Brightcove account the video was hosted on.

LG manufactures remote control models that use Hillcrest Labs' Freespace technology to allow users to change channels using gestures and Dragon NaturallySpeaking technology for voice recognition.

As of 2014, LG is using webOS with a ribbon interface with some of its smart TVs. LG reported that in the first eight months after release, it had sold over 5 million webOS TVs.

In 2016, exclusively to India, Indian arm of South Korea's LG Electronics Inc started selling a TV that would repel mosquitoes. It uses ultrasonic waves that are silent to humans but cause mosquitoes to fly away. It was released on 16 June 2016. The technology was also used in air conditioners and washing machines. The TV is aimed for lower-income consumers living in conditions that would make them susceptible to mosquitoes.

In 2018, it was reported that LG was planning to sell big-screen televisions that could be rolled up and retract automatically with the push of a button come 2019.

Mobile devices
In April 2021, LG officially confirmed that it will shut down its mobile division. Earlier, there had been rumours that LG considered selling its mobile division with Vingroup and Volkswagen named as potential buyers.

Mobile phones

LG Electronics used to manufacture smartphones and tablet devices. Other than the G3, LG officially unveiled the curved smartphone, G Flex, on 27 October 2013. LG released it in South Korea in November 2013 and later announced releases in Europe, the rest of Asia and North America. At Consumer Electronics Show in January 2014, LG announced a US release for the G2 across several major carriers. In 2015, LG released LG G4 globally in late May through early June. On 7 September 2016, LG unveiled the V20, and the V30 was announced on 31 August 2017. LG G6 was officially announced during MWC 2017 on 26 February 2017. The G7 ThinQ model was announced at a 2 May 2018 media briefing.

In April 2021, after months of speculation, LG confirmed that the smartphone division will be officially shut down in July 2021. The decision to shut down LG Mobile came about from poor sales caused by stiff competition from rival Samsung and Chinese brands such as Oppo and Xiaomi. LG became the first major smartphone brand to completely withdraw from the market.

Tablet computers
In 2014, LG announced three new additions to the G series of tablets, which have LG's Knock Code feature, allowing users to unlock devices with a series of taps. The tablets also feature Q Pair which allows tablets to sync up with a smartphone, with phone calls and text messages passed on to the tablet in real time.

Smart watches

LG and Google announced the Android Wear-based smartwatch, the LG G Watch, that was in June 2014. In August 2014, the LG G Watch R that has a circular face (similar to the Moto 360) was released. The LG Watch Urbane that LG's third Android Wear-based smart watch has released in April 2015. This was the first device to support newer smartwatch features such as Wi-Fi, and new parts of Android Wear's software interface, like the ability to draw emoji to friends.

Rolly keyboard
In 2015, LG announced a Bluetooth keyboard that folds up along the four rows of keys for portability. The Rolly keyboard is made of solid plastic. Two tiny plastic arms fold out from the end of the keyboard to support a tablet or smartphone and it can toggle between two different Bluetooth-connected devices at a time. Battery life is an expected three months on a single AAA battery.

Home appliances

LG manufactures home appliances including refrigerators, washing machines, tumble dryers, vacuum cleaners, air conditioners and microwave ovens.
In June 2014, LG Electronics announced the launch of its smart appliances with HomeChat messaging service in South Korea. HomeChat employs LINE, the mobile messenger app from Korean company 'Naver', to let homeowners communicate, control, monitor and share content with LG's smart appliances. Users can send simple messages, such as "start washing cycle," in order to control their washing machines.

In December 2021, LG Electronics announced they were testing and ecologically friendly washing machine that uses liquid carbon dioxide as a cleaner. The company will be conducting a two-year test prove the safety with a goal of having commercial  washers in shopping mall laundries. This new process creates no wastewater and will exhaust gas.

Competitive position: innovation 
In 2021, the World Intellectual Property Organization (WIPO)’s annual World Intellectual Property Indicators report ranked LG's number of patent applications published under the PCT System as 4th in the world, with 2,759 patent applications being published during 2020. This position is an impressive increase from their previous ranking as 10th in 2019 with 1,646 applications. In the same 2021 report, LG's number of designs in industrial design registrations published under the Hague System was ranked as 1st in the world, with 446 design registrations being published during that year, retaining their previous 1st-place ranking in 2019 for 449 design registrations being published.

Marketing and public relations

Sponsorships

LG Sports Limited, a subsidiary of LG Corporation, owns the Korean Baseball Organisation (KBO) LG Twins (LG 트윈스). Through an acquisition in 1990, the MBC Blue Dragons (who was one of the six original founding members of the KBO in 1982) became the LG Twins. The team has won two Korean Series (1990 and 1994). LG attracts a large attendance of fans and to much of their enjoyment, took third place in the league.

In August 2013, LG Electronics announced that it would sponsor German Bundesliga club Bayer 04 Leverkusen for the next three years with an option to extend for one more year. LG sponsors the International Cricket Council, the world governing body for cricket and also sponsors the ICC Awards.

From 2009 to 2013, LG Electronics sponsored Formula One as a Global Partner and Technology Partner. LG was also an official supplier to Virgin Racing and Lotus Racing team, plus engine manufacturer Cosworth from 2010 to 2012. LG also sponsors London Fashion Week and the LG Arena in Birmingham.

During the period 2001–2003, LG sponsored the snooker Grand Prix. During these years the tournament was known as the LG Cup. In 2008, LG became sponsors of the Extreme Sport 'FSO4 Freeze' festival.

The LG Electronics company in Australia dissolved its sponsorship with cricketer David Warner on 27 March 2018 and dropped him as the brand ambassador of the company over the ball tampering scandal during the third Test of their 2017–18 tempestuous series against South Africa. Warner had an agreement with the company in 2014 and his contract had been planned for renewal.

Environmental record
Choice magazine, in independent tests of popular LG fridge models in 2010, found the energy consumption in two models was higher than claimed by LG. LG was aware of the problem and had offered compensation to affected customers. In 2004, LG made 4A-rated water efficiency claims for numerous washing machines before they were certified. LG gave undertakings to the Australian Competition & Consumer Commission to provide appropriate corrective notices and upgrade and maintain its trade practices compliance program. In 2006, LG overstated energy efficiency on five of its air conditioner models and was again required to offer consumers rebates to cover the extra energy costs.

In March 2018, it was announced that one of LG steam clothing care system earned the Asthma & Allergy Friendly Certification.
In May 2020, a deadly gas leak in LG chemical plant in Visakhapatnam killed 12 people. An investigation was set up to look upon the matter revealed many causes for the accident. Improper storage design, haphazard maintenance of the old storage tank, the temperature inside the oldest of the three storage tanks holding styrene monomer, a chemical used in making polystyrene products, rose to more than six times the permitted level due to polymerization, which resulted in the rise of heat due to the chemical reaction are the few causes. It was also suggested to move the company to a less populated area.

Slogans
 "We Put People First" (1997–1999)
 "Digitally Yours" (1999–2004)
 "A Better Life with Digital" (2002–2004)
 "Life's Good" (1999–present in Australia and 2004–present in the rest of the world)
 "Innovation for a Better Life" (2016–present)

See also

 LG Uplus
 Tech companies in the New York metropolitan area

References

External links

 
 
 
 
 
 LG India
 LG Electronics Global Website
 LG Electronics Air Solution Global Blog

 
South Korean companies established in 1958
Electronics companies established in 1958
Companies listed on the Korea Exchange
Companies listed on the London Stock Exchange
Consumer electronics brands
Display technology companies
Electronics companies of South Korea
Home appliance brands
Home appliance manufacturers of South Korea
Heating, ventilation, and air conditioning companies
LG Corporation
Mobile phone manufacturers
Photovoltaics manufacturers
Portable audio player manufacturers
South Korean brands
Vacuum cleaner manufacturers
Video equipment manufacturers
Radio manufacturers